Rob L. Wagner (روب واقنر) (born 1954) is an American journalist covering Middle East issues, particularly political and social topics in Saudi Arabia. In 2015 he was the Saudi Arabia correspondent for the London-based The Arab Weekly newspaper. He previous served as managing editor of the Arab News, an English-language daily newspaper based in Jeddah, Saudi Arabia, and the Saudi Gazette, a competitor of the Arab News. Wagner was also the top editor of Construction Week magazine in Dubai and is the author of numerous history books.

Career
Wagner, who grew up in Sierra Madre, California, began his journalism career in 1974 at the now-defunct Monrovia Daily News-Post as a copy boy and later worked as sports editor for the Hollywood Daily Independent. During the 1980s and 1990s, he was a police and courts reporter for the Ontario, California Daily Report and San Gabriel Valley Tribune. At the Inland Valley Daily Bulletin (formerly the Daily Report) in Ontario, California, he was managing editor. He also worked as a freelance writing on legal affairs issues for the Los Angeles Daily Journal and true crime stories for True Detective magazine. He is the author of more than 20 books, including Hollywood Bohemia: The Roots of Progressive Politics in Rob Wagner's Script (Janaway Publishing, 2016),  Red Ink, White Lies: The Rise and Fall of Los Angeles Newspapers (Dragonflyer Press, 2000), Sleeping Giant: An Illustrated History of California's Inland Empire (Stephens Press, 2003) contributing author for the academic textbook Opposing Viewpoints: Islam, Vol. 2 (Greenhaven Press, Gale Cengage Learning, 2009). and "Witness to a Century: The Inland Valley (Dragonflyer Press, 1999).

Wagner is married to Saudi journalist and educator Dr. Sabria Jawhar.

Saudi Gazette and Arab News
In 2004, Wagner resigned as an editor at The Record (Stockton, California) to become the national editor of the Saudi Gazette, an English-language daily newspaper based in Jeddah, Saudi Arabia. He later became the newspaper's managing editor. As managing editor, he supervised the coverage of Al-Qaeda in the Arabian Peninsula’s bombing and shooting attacks of Westerners and Saudi government institutions, and Saudi Arabia's 2005 municipal elections among other issues. He also taught journalism courses to Saudi university students. In 2008, he assumed the editorship of the Dubai-based Construction Week magazine to cover the building boom in the United Arab Emirates.
In 2012, he returned to Saudi Arabia to assume the post of managing editor at the Arab News.

Reporting
As a journalist, Wagner primarily writes about Saudi and Islamic issues. He provides analysis on Saudi women's issues for Peace and Conflict Review, which is published by the University for Peace of Costa Rica. Most recently, he reports for The Arab Weekly, a newspaper based in London that provides political and cultural analysis of the Middle East and North Africa regions. His articles for the Media Line, a Middle East news website, has been syndicated to the Yemen Times, Kuwait Times, Daily News Egypt, Gulf News and the Arab News. He is also a correspondent on Shariah-compliant/Islamic tourism for Thomson Reuters wire service, contributor for Lonely Planet and contributing columnist for the  International Business Times in London.

References

External links 
 Rob L. Wagner website
 The Media Line Middle East News Source
 Saudi Gazette
 Construction Week
 Library of Congress Catalog
 Arab News

American male journalists
Journalists from California
People from Sierra Madre, California
1954 births
Living people